Lakes West is a census-designated place (CDP) in the town of Ridgefield, Fairfield County, Connecticut, United States. It is in the northern part of the town on the north side of Ridgebury Mountain and extending north into a valley occupied by Lake Windwing. It is bordered to the east by the Lakes East CDP and to the northwest by Ridgebury.

Lakes West was first listed as a CDP prior to the 2020 census.

References 

Census-designated places in Fairfield County, Connecticut
Census-designated places in Connecticut